Russell Fensham (born 14 November 1957) is a South African cricketer and field hockey player. He played in 33 first-class and 14 List A matches for Eastern Province from 1979/80 to 1983/84.

See also
 List of Eastern Province representative cricketers

References

External links
 

1957 births
Living people
South African cricketers
Eastern Province cricketers
Cricketers from Port Elizabeth
South African male field hockey players